Sarana Valley is a valley in the mountains of northeastern Attu Island in the Aleutian Islands in Alaska.

Together with Sarana Pass, Sarana Valley leads from Sarana Bay on the east coast of the island northward to Chichagof Harbor on the island's northeast coast.

Notes

References
Merriam-Webster's Geographical Dictionary, Third Edition. Springfield, Massachusetts: Merriam-Webster, Incorporated, 1997. .

Landforms of the Aleutian Islands
Landforms of Aleutians West Census Area, Alaska
Valleys of Alaska
Attu Island